Joseph Matthäus Aigner (18 January 1818, Vienna19 February 1886, Vienna) was an Austrian portrait painter, who studied under Friedrich von Amerling and Carl Rahl. He painted portraits of Franz Joseph I of Austria and his wife Elizabeth, Franz Grillparzer, Friedrich Halm, Nikolaus Lenau, and Maximilian I of Mexico.

In 1847 he married actress Fanny Matras (1828–1878).

As commander of the Academic Legion during the 1848 revolutions in Vienna, Aigner was court-martialed for high treason and condemned to death. However, Alfred I, Prince of Windisch-Grätz pardoned him.

According to Ripley's Believe It or Not!, a Capuchin monk, whose name Aigner never knew, saved his life three times, when he attempted to hang himself at ages 18 and 22 and when he was sentenced to death. Aigner successfully committed suicide with a pistol in Vienna in 1886, and the same monk presided over his funeral.

Works 

 Portrait einer jungen blonden Dame mit Stirnlocken (18??)
 Portrait of a lady with her dog (1863)
 Portrait of Clementina Weyl (1865)
 Portrait of a young boy wearing a coloured sash (1876)

References 

1818 births
1886 deaths
19th-century Austrian painters
19th-century Austrian male artists
Austrian male painters
Austrian portrait painters
Suicides by firearm in Austria
Artists from Vienna
1880s suicides
People of the Revolutions of 1848